Etta Jones Sings Lady Day is the final studio album by vocalist Etta Jones, featuring songs associated with Billie Holiday, which was recorded in 2001 and released on the HighNote label.

Reception

In his review on Allmusic, Scott Yanow states "Etta Jones' last 20 years found her recording one consistently soulful jazz album after another, usually with the close partnership of tenor-saxophonist Houston Person. For what would be her final recording, she pays tribute to Billie Holiday with renditions of nine standards. ... The singer passed away on the day that Sings Lady Day was officially released and she sounds in surprisingly good form throughout this set, finishing off her career on top".

Track listing 
 "That Ole Devil Called Love" (Allan Roberts, Doris Fisher) – 5:10
 "All of Me" (Gerald Marks, Seymour Simons) – 8:24
 "But Beautiful" (Jimmy Van Heusen, Johnny Burke) – 6:15	
 "You've Changed" (Bill Carey, Carl T. Fischer) – 5:03
 "I Cried for You" (Arthur Freed, Abe Lyman, Gus Arnheim) – 7:46
 "Fine and Mellow" (Billie Holiday) – 7:10
 "God Bless the Child" (Arthur Herzog Jr., Holiday) – 7:16
 "Them There Eyes" (Maceo Pinkard, Doris Tauber, William Tracey) – 3:55
 "You Better Go Now" (Robert Graham, Bickley Reichmer) – 5:37

Personnel 
Etta Jones – vocals
Houston Person – tenor saxophone 
Richard Wyands – piano
Peter Bernstein – guitar
John Webber – bass
Chip White – drums

References 

Etta Jones albums
2001 albums
HighNote Records albums
Billie Holiday tribute albums